This is a list of players' statistics for 2014 Indonesia Super League. It consists of lists of goal-scorers, hat-tricks, own goals, clean sheets and disciplines.

Scoring

First goal of the season: Lukas Mandowen for Persipura Jayapura against Persela Lamongan (1 February 2014)
Fastest goal of the season: 20 seconds - Lukas Mandowen for Persipura Jayapura against Persebaya ISL (Bhayangkara) (15 April 2014)
Last goal of the season: 
Widest winning margin: 5 goals
Arema Cronus 5–0 Persik Kediri (6 February 2014)
Putra Samarinda 5–0 Perseru Serui (9 February 2014)
Arema Cronus 5–0 Gresik United (8 May 2014)
Persib Bandung 5-0 Persijap Jepara (August 19, 2014)
Highest scoring game: 7 goals
Persiba Bantul 2–5 Persipura Jayapura (2 May 2014)
Most goals scored in a match by a single team: 5 goals
Arema Cronus 5–0 Persik Kediri (6 February 2014)
Putra Samarinda 5–0 Perseru Serui (9 February 2014)
Mitra Kukar 5–1 Persela Lamongan (20 February 2014)
Persik Kediri 5–1 Sriwijaya (26 April 2014)
Persiba Bantul 2–5 Persipura Jayapura (2 May 2014)
Arema Cronus 5–0 Gresik United (8 May 2014)
Persib Bandung 5-0 Persijap Jepara (August 19, 2014)
Most goals scored in a match by a losing team: 2 goals
Gresik United 3–2 Persijap Jepara (6 February 2014)
Persita Tangerang 3–2 Gresik United (10 February 2014)
Perseru Serui 3–2 Persiba Balikpapan (23 February 2014)
Persib Bandung 3–2 Arema Cronus (13 April 2014)
Persiba Bantul 2–5 Persipura Jayapura (2 May 2014)
Sriwijaya 4–2 Barito Putera (4 May 2014)
Persiba Bantul 2–3 Persela Lamongan (2 June 2014)
Persita Tangerang 2–4 Semen Padang (7 June 2014)
Widest home winning margin: 5 goals
Arema Cronus 5–0 Persik Kediri (6 February 2014)
Putra Samarinda 5–0 Perseru Serui (9 February 2014)
Arema Cronus 5–0 Gresik United (8 May 2014)
Persib Bandung 5-0 Persijap Jepara (August 19, 2014)
Widest away winning margin: 4 goals
Persita Tangerang 0–4 Persija Jakarta (12 June 2014)
Most goals scored by a home team: 5 goals
Arema Cronus 5–0 Persik Kediri (6 February 2014)
Putra Samarinda 5–0 Perseru Serui (9 February 2014)
Mitra Kukar 5–1 Persela Lamongan (20 February 2014)
Persik Kediri 5–1 Sriwijaya (26 April 2014)
Arema Cronus 5–0 Gresik United (8 May 2014)
Persib Bandung 5-0 Persijap Jepara (August 19, 2014)
Most goals scored by an away team: 5 goals
Persiba Bantul 2–5 Persipura Jayapura (2 May 2014)

Team records
Longest winning run: 5
Arema Cronus
Longest unbeaten run: 16
Persipura Jayapura
Longest winless run: 9
Persijap Jepara
Longest losing run: 9
Persijap Jepara
Longest clean sheet run: 5
Arema Cronus

Top scorers

 In Italic is previous club on first half season.

Own goals

Hat-tricks

 4 Player scored 4 goals
 5 Player scored 5 goals

Clean Sheets
A number of 45 goalkeepers had appeared representing 22 clubs this season.

Updated to games played on 7 August 2014.

Players

Clubs
 Most clean sheets: 11
 Arema Cronus
 Fewest clean sheets: 0
 Persiba Bantul

Discipline

Player
Most yellow cards: 6
Elvis Herawan (Persiram)
Gerald Pangkali (Persipura)
Most red cards: 2
Patrice Nzekou (Persiba Balikpapan)
Erik Setiawan (Putra Samarinda)
Achmad Sumardi (Sriwijaya)

Club

 Most yellow cards: 45
Persiram Raja Ampat
 Most red cards: 5
Sriwijaya

References

Statistics